Rose quartz is a type of quartz which exhibits a pale pink to rose red hue.

Rose Quartz may also refer to:

 Rose quartz (color), a gray shade of magenta
 Rose Quartz (Fabergé egg)
  Rose Quartz (My Little Pony), one of the Crystal Ponies from the My Little Pony franchise
 "Rose Quartz", a song by Toro y Moi from their album Anything in Return
 Rose Quartz, Steven's mother in the animated series Steven Universe